Document is a basic theoretical construct that refers to everything that may be preserved or represented in order to serve as evidence for some purpose.

Document or documents may also refer to:
Documentation, written account of an idea
Electronic document, simply called a document, any electronic media content other than computer programs or system files
Document file format, a type of computer file referred to as "Document" that contains text
Web document, similar in concept to a web page, but also satisfies the following broader definition by World Wide Web Consortium
Document (album) (1987) by the American alternative rock band R.E.M
Document (TV series), a Canadian documentary television series which aired on CBC Television from 1962 to 1969
Document Records, a British record label associated with American rural music genres
Documents (magazine), a surrealist art magazine edited by Georges Bataille and published in Paris from 1929 through 1930
 Documented (EP), an EP by J. Tillman
Document Journal

See also
Documentary (disambiguation)